Scotura flavicapilla is a moth of the family Notodontidae. It is found in French Guiana, Suriname, Guyana and Brazil.

The larvae feed on Rinorea macrocarpa.

References

Moths described in 1823
Notodontidae of South America